Fahri Ogün Yardım (born 4 July 1980) is a German actor.

Biography 
Yardım was born in Hamburg, Germany, where his parents moved from Turkey.

He is best known for his portrayal of Hüseyin in Almanya – Welcome to Germany and as investigator Yalcin Gümer in the German crime television series Tatort alongside Til Schweiger.

In 2013, he had a supporting role in the adventure film The Physician, which became an immediate box office hit in Germany.

Selected filmography

References

External links 
 Yardım at Agentur Velvet
 

German male film actors
1980 births
Living people
German people of Turkish descent
German male television actors
21st-century German male actors